Cassie Keller may refer to:
an actor in The Wicked (2013 film)
a character in the film R. L. Stine's The Haunting Hour: Don't Think About It